Jan Marek (born July 25, 1947) is an American retired professional ice hockey goaltender who played three seasons (1979–82) in the Eishockey-Bundesliga league for the DEG Metro Stars.

External links

1947 births
American men's ice hockey goaltenders
DEG Metro Stars players
Living people
Ice hockey players from New York (state)